Carl Julius Alvin Westerlund (2 June 1885 – 14 May 1952) was a Norwegian politician for the Labour Party.

He was born in Bodø.

He was elected to the Norwegian Parliament from the Market towns of Vest-Agder and Rogaland counties in 1945, but was not re-elected in 1949. He had previously served in the position of deputy representative during the term 1925–1927.

Westerlund held various positions in Haugesund city council from 1913 to 1940, serving as mayor in 1919 and 1922.

References

1885 births
1952 deaths
Labour Party (Norway) politicians
Members of the Storting
Politicians from Bodø
20th-century Norwegian politicians